Vishwa Jain Sangathan (VJS) is a religious and social service organization of Jains in India. Amongst other things, it was involved in the Jain minority campaign.

History
The organization was founded in 2005 in Delhi. It organizes various conferences that revolve around Jain community issues.

Issues

Jain minority
The organization has been involved in securing the status of an independent and minority religion for Jainism in India. It submitted a petition to the Delhi Government which played a part in Jains getting declared as a minority in Delhi. The organization has also presented memorandums to the Punjab Government for providing the status of a religious minority to Jains in Punjab.

The organization also stages protests and rallies to highlight their cause.

Lucknow idol desecration
VJS also actively protested the desecration of Mahavira's idol in Lucknow.

Others
The organization has also campaigned on a number of other issues, including the "Arihant Exports" name issue, Qutub Minar Jain museum, January 2013 attack on Muni Prabalsagar at Girnar etc.

See also
 Legal status of Jainism as a distinct religion in India

References

Jain organisations
Religious organizations established in 2005
Religious organisations based in India
2005 establishments in Delhi